William O'Reilly  or Bill O'Reilly may refer to:

 William O'Reilly (MP) (1792–1844), UK MP for the Irish constituency of Dundalk, 1832–1835
 William O'Reilly (educator) (1864–1937), Irish educator
 William Edmund O'Reilly (1873–1934), British diplomat
 Bill O'Reilly (cricketer) (1905–1992), Australian cricketer
 Bill O'Reilly (political commentator) (born 1949), American commentator, author and former television host
 William F. B. O'Reilly (born 1963), American political consultant

See also
William Riley (disambiguation)